Religious violence in Nigeria refers to Christian-Muslim strife in modern Nigeria, which can be traced back to 1953. Today, religious violence in Nigeria is dominated by the Boko Haram insurgency, which aims to establish an Islamic state in Nigeria.

Background
Nigeria was amalgamated in 1914, only about a decade after the defeat of the Sokoto Caliphate and other Islamic states by the British, which were to constitute much of Northern Nigeria. The aftermath of the First World War saw Germany lose its colonies, one of which was Cameroon, to French, Belgian and British mandates. Cameroon was divided into French and British parts, the latter of which was further subdivided into southern and northern parts. Following a plebiscite in 1961, the Southern Cameroons elected to rejoin French Cameroon, while the Northern Cameroons opted to join Nigeria, a move which added to Nigeria's already large Northern Muslim population. The territory comprised much of what is now Northeastern Nigeria, and a large part of the areas affected by the present and past insurgencies.

Following the return of democratic government in 1999, the Muslim-dominated northern Nigerian states have introduced Sharia law, including punishments against blasphemy and apostasy. Several incidents have occurred whereby people have been killed for or in response to perceived blasphemy.

History

Religious conflict in Nigeria goes as far back as 1953, and in the case of the town of Tafawa Balewa, to 1948. 
The 1980s saw an upsurge in violence due to the death of Mohammed Marwa ("Maitatsine") (see below). In the same decade, the military ruler of Nigeria, General Ibrahim Babangida, enrolled Nigeria in the Organisation of the Islamic Conference. This was a move which aggravated religious tensions in the country, particularly among the Christian community. In response, some in the Muslim community pointed out that certain other African member states have smaller proportions of Muslims, as well as Nigeria's diplomatic relations with the Holy See.

Since the return of democracy to Nigeria in 1999, Sharia was instituted as a main body of civil and criminal law in 9 Muslim-majority and in some parts of 3 Muslim-plurality states, when then-Zamfara State governor Ahmad Rufai Sani began the push for the institution of Sharia at the state level of government.

1980s
In the 1980s, the serious outbreak between Christians and Muslims occurred in Kafanchan in southern Kaduna State in a border area between the two religions, propagated by extreme leaders who were able to rally a young, educated group of individuals who feared that the nation would not be able to protect their religious group. The leaders were able to polarize their followers through speeches and public demonstrations.

The activities in those times had led to the loss of lives and properties as they moved about destroying government facilities which they saw as legacies or replica of western cultures in their various communities. These religious campaigns have seen an increase in gun battles between the members of these sects and security forces with loss of lives witnessed on both sides. Although direct conflicts between Christians and Muslims were rare, tensions did flare between the two groups as each group radicalised. There were clashes in October 1982 when Muslim zealots in Kano were able to enforce their power in order to keep the Anglican House Church from expanding its size and power base. They saw it as a threat to the nearby Mosque, even though the Anglican House Church had been there forty years prior to the building of the Mosque. Additionally, there were two student groups in Nigeria who came into contestation, the Fellowship of Christian Students and the Muslim Student Society. In one instance there was an evangelical campaign organised by the FCS and brought into question why one sect should dominate the campus of the Kaduna State College of Education in Kafanchan. This quarrel accelerated to the point where the Muslim students organised protests around the city and burned a Church at the college. The Christian majority at the college retaliated on March 9. Twelve people died, several Mosques were burnt and a climate of fear was created. The retaliation was pre-planned.

The exploitation of the media used to propagate the ideas of the conflict, thereby radicalising each force even more. Media was biased on each side so while places like the Federal Radio Corporation discussed the idea of defending Islam during this brief moment of terror, it did not report the deaths and damage caused by Muslims, galvanising the Muslim population. Similarly, the Christian papers did not report the damage and deaths caused by Christians but rather focused on the Islamic terror. Other individuals leading these religious movements use the media to spread messages which gradually became more intolerant of other religions, and because of these religious divisions radical Islam continues to be a problem in Nigeria today.

Maitatsine

In the late 1970s and early 1980s, there was a major Islamic uprising led by Maitatsine and his followers, Yan Tatsine that led to several thousand deaths. After Maitatsine's death in 1980, the movement continued some five years more.

1990s
In 1991, the German evangelist Reinhard Bonnke attempted a crusade in Kano, causing a religious riot leading to the deaths of more than a dozen people.

2000s–2010s
Since the restoration of democracy in 1999, secular governments have dominated the country at the federal level, while the Muslim-dominated Northern Nigerian states have implemented strict Sharia law. Religious conflict between Muslims and Christians has erupted several times since 2000 for various reasons, often causing riots with several thousands of victims on both sides. Since 2009, the Islamist movement Boko Haram has fought an armed rebellion against the Nigerian military, sacking villages and towns and taking thousands of lives in battles and massacres against Christians, students and others deemed enemies of Islam.

Riots
The events of Abuja in 2000 and Jos in 2001 were riots between Christians and Muslims in Jos, Nigeria about the appointment of a Muslim politician, Alhaji Muktar Mohammed, as local coordinator of the federal programme to fight poverty. Another such riot killed over 100 people in October 2001 in Kano State.

In 2002, the Nigerian journalist Isioma Daniel wrote an article that led to the demonstrations and violence that caused the deaths of over 200 in Kaduna, as well as a fatwa placed on her life. The 2002 Miss World contest was moved from Abuja to London as a result. The rest of the 2000s decade would see inter-religious violence continue in Jos and Kaduna.

The reaction to the Mohammed cartoons brought about a series of violent protests in Nigeria. Clashes between rioters and police claimed several lives, with estimates ranging from 16 to more than a hundred. This led to reprisal attacks in the south of the country, particularly in Onitsha. More than a hundred lost their lives.

2010s–2020s
In 2018, US President Donald Trump called out the killing of Christians in Nigeria.

In May 2022, Deborah Yakubu, a Christian student in Sokoto, was lynched outside her university by a Muslim mob. Following the lynching, there was violence against other Christian sites, according to a statement released by the Catholic Diocese of Sokoto. "During the protest, groups of youths led by some adults in the background attacked the Holy Family Catholic Cathedral at Bello Way, destroying church glass windows, those of the Bishop Lawton Secretariat, and vandalized a community bus parked within the premises. St. Kevin’s Catholic Church was also attacked and partly burnt; windows of the new hospital complex under construction, in the same premises, were shattered. The hoodlums also attacked the Bakhita Centre […], burning down a bus within the premises.”

In June 2022, a massacre left over 50 parishioners dead in the St. Francis Xavier Church, in Owo. Responsibility for the attack was unclear, but the Government blamed ISWAP, whereas many locals blamed Fulani herdsmen. 

In a speech in the European Parliament, in October 2022, bishop Wilfred Chikpa Anagbe, of the Roman Catholic Diocese of Makurdi, compared the situation of Christians in his country to "nothing short of a Jihad clothed in many names: terrorism, kidnappings, killer herdsmen, banditry, other militia groups" and called on the international community to abandon what he termed a "conspiracy of silence" on the subject.

See also
 Religion in Nigeria
 Sharia in Nigeria
 Islamic extremism in Northern Nigeria
 List of massacres in Nigeria
 Timeline of Boko Haram insurgency

References

External links
Arewa politicians are to blame for riots in Nigeria - OPC's chief speaks out in Germany
 Nigeria Religious Sectarianism

 
Terrorism in Nigeria